Karl Fritz Lindahl (26 September 1890 – 29 June 1960) was a Swedish gymnast who competed in the 1920 Summer Olympics. He was part of the Swedish team, which was able to win the gold medal in the men's gymnastics team, Swedish system event in 1920.

References

1890 births
1960 deaths
Swedish male artistic gymnasts
Gymnasts at the 1920 Summer Olympics
Olympic gymnasts of Sweden
Olympic gold medalists for Sweden
Olympic medalists in gymnastics
Medalists at the 1920 Summer Olympics